Records of the Grand Historian, also known by its Chinese name Shiji, is a monumental history of China that is the first of China's 24 dynastic histories. The Records was written in the late 2nd century to early 1st century by the ancient Chinese historian Sima Qian, whose father Sima Tan had begun it several decades earlier. The work covers a 2,500-year period from the age of the legendary Yellow Emperor to the reign of Emperor Wu of Han in the author's own time, and describes the world as it was known to the Chinese of the Western Han dynasty.

The Records has been called a "foundational text in Chinese civilization". After Confucius and the First Emperor of Qin, "Sima Qian was one of the creators of Imperial China, not least because by providing definitive biographies, he virtually created the two earlier figures." The Records set the model for all subsequent dynastic histories of China. In contrast to Western historical works, the Records do not treat history as "a continuous, sweeping narrative", but rather break it up into smaller, overlapping units dealing with famous leaders, individuals, and major topics of significance.

History

The work that became Records of the Grand Historian was begun by Sima Tan, who was Grand Historian (also translated "Grand Scribe") of the Han dynasty court during the late 2nd century. Sima Tan drafted plans for the ambitious work and left behind some fragments and notes that may have been incorporated into the final text. After his death in 110, the project was continued and completed by his son and successor Sima Qian, who is generally credited as the work's author. The exact date of the Records completion is unknown. But it is certain that Sima Qian completed it by ca. 91 BC, before his death in approximately 86, with one copy residing in the imperial capital of Chang'an (present-day Xi'an) and the other copy probably being stored in his home.

The original title of the work, as given by the author in the postface is Taishigongshu, or Records of the Grand Historian, although it was also known by a variety of other titles, including Taishigongji and Taishigongzhuan in ancient times. Eventually, Shiji, or Historical Records became the most commonly used title in Chinese. This title was originally used to refer to any general historical text, although after the Three Kingdoms period, Shiji gradually began to be used exclusively to refer to Sima Qian's work. In English, the original title, Records of the Grand Historian is in common use, although Historical Records, The Grand Scribe's Records, and Records of the Historian are also used.

The history of the Records early reception and circulation is not well known. Several 1st-century BC authors, such as the scholar Chu Shaosun (fl. 327), added interpolations to the Records. These scholars may have had to reconstruct portions of the Records, as ten of its original 130 chapters were lost in the Eastern Han period (AD 25220) and seem to have been reconstructed later.

Beginning in the Northern and Southern dynasties (420589) and the Tang dynasty (618907), several scholars wrote and edited commentaries to the Records. Most 2nd-millennium editions of the Records include the commentaries of Pei Yin (5th century), Sima Zhen (early 8th century), and Zhang Shoujie (early 8th century). The combined commentaries of these three scholars is known as the Sanjiazhu ("commentaries of the three experts"). The primary modern edition of the Records is the ten-volume Zhonghua Book Company edition of 1959 (revised in 1982), which is based on an edition prepared by the Chinese historian Gu Jiegang in the early 1930s and includes the Sanjiazhu.

Manuscripts
There are two known surviving fragments of pre-Tang dynasty Records manuscripts, both of which are held in the Ishiyama-dera temple in Ōtsu, Japan. Portions of at least nine Tang dynasty manuscripts survive: three fragments discovered among the Dunhuang manuscripts in the early 20th century, and six manuscripts preserved in Japanese temples and museums, such as the Kōzan-ji temple in Kyoto and the Tōyō Bunko museum in Tokyo. Several woodblock printed editions of the Records survive, the earliest of which date to the Song dynasty (9601279).

Contents
 

In all, the Records is about 526,500 Chinese characters long, making it four times longer than Thucydides' History of the Peloponnesian War and longer than the Old Testament.

Sima Qian conceived and composed his work in self-contained units, with a good deal of repetition between them. His manuscript was written on bamboo slips with about 24 to 36 characters each, and assembled into bundles of around 30 slips. Even after the manuscript was allowed to circulate or be copied, the work would have circulated as bundles of bamboo slips or small groups. Endymion Wilkinson calculates that there were probably between 466 and 700 bundles, whose total weight would have been , which would have been difficult to access and hard to transport. Later copies on silk would have been much lighter, but also expensive and rare. Until the work was transferred to paper many centuries later, circulation would have been difficult and piecemeal, which accounts for many of the errors and variations in the text.

Sima Qian organized the chapters of Records of the Grand Historian into five categories, which each comprise a section of the book.

"Basic Annals"
The "Basic Annals" (běnjì ) make up the first 12 chapters of the Records, and are largely similar to records from the ancient Chinese court chronicle tradition, such as the Spring and Autumn Annals. The first five cover either periods, such as the Five Emperors, or individual dynasties, such as the Xia, Shang, and Zhou dynasties. The last seven cover individual rulers, starting with the First Emperor of Qin and progressing through the first emperors of the Han dynasty. In this section, Sima chose to also include de facto rulers of China, such as Xiang Yu and Empress Dowager Lü, while excluding rulers who never held any real power, such as Emperor Yi of Chu and Emperor Hui of Han.

"Tables"
Chapters 13 to 22 are the "Tables" (biǎo ), which comprise one genealogical table and nine other chronological tables. They show reigns, important events, and royal lineages in table form, which Sima Qian stated that he did because "the chronologies are difficult to follow when different genealogical lines exist at the same time." Each table except the last one begins with an introduction to the period it covers.

"Treatises"
The "Treatises" (shū , sometimes called "Monographs") is the shortest of the five Records sections, and contains eight chapters (23–30) on the historical evolution of ritual, music, pitch pipes, the calendar, astronomy, sacrifices, rivers and waterways, and financial administration.

"Hereditary Houses"
The "Hereditary Houses" (shìjiā ) is the second largest of the five Records sections, and comprises chapters 31 to 60. Within this section, the earlier chapters are very different in nature than the later chapters. Many of the earlier chapters are chronicle-like accounts of the leading states of the Zhou dynasty, such as the states of Qin and Lu, and two of the chapters go back as far as the Shang dynasty. The later chapters, which cover the Han dynasty, contain biographies.

"Ranked Biographies"
The "Ranked Biographies" (lièzhuàn , usually shortened to "Biographies") is the largest of the five Records sections, covering chapters 61 to 130, and accounts for 42% of the entire work. The 69 "Biographies" chapters mostly contain biographical profiles of about 130 outstanding ancient Chinese men, ranging from the moral paragon Boyi from the end of the Shang dynasty to some of Sima Qian's near contemporaries. About 40 of the chapters are dedicated to one particular man, but some are about two related figures, while others cover small groups of figures who shared certain roles, such as assassins, caring officials, or Confucian scholars. Unlike most modern biographies, the accounts in the "Biographies" give profiles using anecdotes to depict morals and character, with "unforgettably lively impressions of people of many different kinds and of the age in which they lived." The "Biographies" have been popular throughout Chinese history, and have provided a large number of set phrases still used in modern Chinese.

Style

Unlike subsequent official historical texts that adopted Confucian doctrine, proclaimed the divine rights of the emperors, and degraded any failed claimant to the throne, Sima Qian's more liberal and objective prose has been renowned and followed by poets and novelists. Most volumes of Liezhuan are vivid descriptions of events and persons. Sima Qian sought out stories from those who might have closer knowledge of certain historical events, using them as sources to balance the reliability and accuracy of historical records. For instance, the material on Jing Ke's attempt at assassinating the King of Qin incorporates an eye-witness account by Xia Wuju, a physician to the king of Qin who happened to be attending the diplomatic ceremony for Jing Ke, and this account was passed on to Sima Qian by those who knew Xia.

It has been observed that the diplomatic Sima Qian has a way of accentuating the positive in his treatment of rulers in the Basic Annals, but slipping negative information into other chapters, and so his work must be read as a whole to obtain full information. For example, the information that Liu Bang (later Emperor Gaozu of Han), in a desperate attempt to escape in a chase from Xiang Yu's men, pushed his own children off his carriage to lighten it, was not given in the emperor's biography, but in the biography of Xiang Yu. He is also careful to balance the negative with the positive, for example, in the biography of Empress Dowager Lu which contains startling accounts of her cruelty, he pointed out at the end that, despite whatever her personal life may have been, her rule brought peace and prosperity to the country.

Source materials
Sima's family were hereditary historians to the Han emperor. Sima Qian's father Sima Tan served as Grand Historian, and Sima Qian succeeded to his position. Thus he had access to the early Han dynasty archives, edicts, and records. Sima Qian was a methodical, skeptical historian who had access to ancient books, written on bamboo and wooden slips, from before the time of the Han dynasty. Many of the sources he used did not survive. He not only used archives and imperial records, but also interviewed people and traveled around China to verify information. In his first chapter, "Annals of the Five Emperors," he writes,

The Grand Historian used The Annals of the Five Emperors and the Classic of History as source materials to make genealogies from the time of the Yellow Emperor until that of the Gonghe regency (841–828 BC). Sima Qian often cites his sources. For example, in the first chapter, "Annals of the Five Emperors", he writes, "I have read the Spring and Autumn Annals and the Guoyu." In his 13th chapter, "Genealogical Table of the Three Ages," Sima Qian writes, "I have read all the genealogies of the kings (dieji ) that exist since the time of the Yellow Emperor." In his 14th chapter, "Yearly Chronicle of the Feudal Lords", he writes, "I have read all the royal annals (chunqiu li pudie ) up until the time of King Li of Zhou." In his 15th chapter, "Yearly Chronicle of the Six States," he writes, "I have read the Annals of Qin (qin ji ), and they say that the Quanrong [a barbarian tribe] defeated King You of Zhou [ca 771 BC]."

In the 19th chapter, he writes, "I have occasion to read over the records of enfeoffment and come to the case of Wu Qian, the marquis of Bian...." (The father of Marquis Bian, Wu Rui, was named king (wang) of Changsha for his loyalty to Gaozu.) In his chapter on the patriotic minister and poet Qu Yuan, Sima Qian writes, "I have read [Qu Yuan's works] Li Sao, Tianwen ("Heaven Asking"), Zhaohun (summoning the soul), and Ai Ying (Lament for Ying)". In the 62nd chapter, "Biography of Guan and of Yan", he writes, "I have read Guan's Mu Min ( - "Government of the People", a chapter in the Guanzi), Shan Gao ("The Mountains Are High"), Chengma (chariot and horses; a long section on war and economics), Qingzhong (Light and Heavy; i.e. "what is important"), and Jiufu (Nine Houses), as well as the Spring and Autumn Annals of Yanzi." In his 64th chapter, "Biography of Sima Rangju", the Grand Historian writes, "I have read Sima's Art of War." In the 121st chapter, "Biographies of Scholars", he writes, "I read the Imperial Decrees that encouraged education officials."

Sima Qian wrote of the problems with incomplete, fragmentary and contradictory sources. For example, he mentioned in the preface to chapter 15 that the chronicle records of the feudal states kept in the Zhou dynasty's archive were burnt by Qin Shi Huang because they contained criticisms and ridicule of the Qin state, and that the Qin annals were brief and incomplete. In the 13th chapter he mentioned that the chronologies and genealogies of different ancient texts "disagree and contradict each other throughout". In his 18th chapter, Sima Qian writes, "I have set down only what is certain, and in doubtful cases left a blank."

Reliability and accuracy
Scholars have questioned the historicity of legendary kings of the ancient periods given by Sima Qian. Sima Qian began the Shiji with an account of the five rulers of supreme virtue, the Five Emperors, who modern scholars, such as those from the Doubting Antiquity School, believe to be originally local deities of the peoples of ancient China. Sima Qian sifted out elements of the supernatural and fantastic which seemed to contradict their existence as actual human monarchs, and was therefore criticized for turning myths and folklore into sober history.

However, according to Joseph Needham, who wrote in 1954 on Sima Qian's accounts of the kings of the Shang dynasty (c. 1600 – c. 1050 BC): 

While the king names in Sima Qian's history of the Shang dynasty are supported by inscriptions on the oracle bones, there is, as yet, no archaeological corroboration of Sima Qian's history of the Xia dynasty.

There are also discrepancies of fact such as dates between various portions of the work. This may be a result of Sima Qian's use of different source texts.

Transmission and supplementation by other writers
After ca. 91 BC, the more-or-less completed manuscript was hidden in the residence of the author's daughter, Sima Ying, to avoid destruction under Emperor Wu and his immediate successor Emperor Zhao. The Shiji was finally disseminated during the reign of Emperor Xuan by Sima Qian's grandson (through his daughter), Yang Yun, after a hiatus of around twenty years.

The changes in the manuscript of the Shiji during this hiatus have always been disputed among scholars. That the text was more or less complete by ca. 91 BC is established in the Letter to Ren'an, composed in the Zhenghe era of Emperor Wu's reign. In this letter, Sima Qian describes his work as "spanning from the time of the Yellow Emperor to the present age and consisting of ten tables, twelve basic annals, eight treatises, thirty chapters on hereditary houses, and seventy biographies, together totaling 130 chapters." These numbers are likewise given in the postface to Shiji.

After his death (presumably only a few years later), few people had the opportunity to see the whole work. However, various additions were still made to it. The historian Liu Zhiji reported the names of a total of fifteen scholars supposed to have added material to the Shiji during the period after the death of Sima Qian. Only the additions by Chu Shaosun (c. 105 – c. 30 BC) are clearly indicated by adding "Mr Chu said," (Chu xiansheng yue). Already in the first century AD, Ban Biao and Ban Gu claimed that ten chapters in Records of the Grand Historian were lacking.  A large number of chapters dealing with the first century of the Han dynasty (i.e. the 2nd century BC) correspond exactly to the relevant chapters from the Book of Han (Hanshu). It is unclear whether those chapters initially came from the Shiji or from the Hanshu. Researchers Yves Hervouet (1921–1999) and A. F. P. Hulsewé argued that the originals of those chapters of the Shiji were lost and they were later reconstructed using the corresponding chapters from the Hanshu.

Editions
The earliest extant copy of Records of the Grand Historian, handwritten, was made during the Southern and Northern Dynasties period (420–589 AD). The earliest printed edition, called Shiji jijie (literally Records of the Grand Historian, Collected Annotations), was published during the Northern Song dynasty. Huang Shanfu's edition, printed under the Southern Song dynasty, is the earliest collection of the Sanjiazhu commentaries on Records of the Grand Historian (literally: The Combined Annotations of the Three Experts).

In modern times, the Zhonghua Book Company in Beijing has published the book in both simplified Chinese for mass consumption and traditional Chinese for scholarly study. The 1959 (2nd ed., 1982) Sanjiazhu edition in traditional Chinese (based upon the Jinling Publishing House edition, see below) contains commentaries interspersed among the main text and is considered to be an authoritative modern edition.

The most well-known editions of the Shiji are:

Notable translations

English
 Herbert J. Allen, Ssŭma Ch‘ien's Historical Records, The Journal of the Royal Asiatic Society of Great Britain and Ireland, 1894, p. 269-294; 1895, p. 93-110, 601-611, available online. (The first English translation of the first three chapters).
Watson, Burton, trans. (1961). Records of the Grand Historian of China. New York: Columbia University Press.
Second edition, 1993 (Records of the Grand Historian). Translates roughly 90 out of 130 chapters.
Qin dynasty, .
Han dynasty, Volume 1, .
Han dynasty, Volume 2, .
 Yang Hsien-yi and Gladys Yang (1974), Records of the Historians. Hong Kong: Commercial Press.
Reprinted by University Press of the Pacific, 2002. Contains biographies of Confucius and Laozi. 
 Raymond Stanley Dawson (1994). Historical records. New York: Oxford University Press.
 Reprinted, 2007 (The first emperor : selections from the Historical records). Translates only Qin-related material. 
 William H. Nienhauser, Jr., ed. (1994– ). The Grand Scribe's Records, 9 vols. Bloomington: Indiana University Press. Ongoing translation, and being translated out of order. As of 2020, translates 92 out of 130 chapters.
 I. The Basic Annals of Pre-Han China (2018), .
 II. The Basic Annals of the Han Dynasty (2018), .
 V. part 1. The Hereditary Houses of Pre-Han China (2006), .
 VII. The Memoirs of Pre-Han China (1995), .
 VIII. The Memoirs of Han China, Part I (2008), .
 IX. The Memoirs of Han China, Part II (2010), .
 X. The Memoirs of Han China, Part III (2016), .
 XI. The Memoirs of Han China, Part IV (2019), .

Non-English
 Chavannes, Édouard, trans. (1895–1905). Les Mémoires historiques de Se-ma Ts'ien [The Historical Memoirs of Sima Qian], 6 vols.; rpt. (1967–1969) 7 vols., Paris: Adrien Maisonneuve. Left uncompleted at Chavannes' death. William Nienhauser calls it a "landmark" and "the standard by which all subsequent renditions... must be measured.". Accessible online at Se-ma Ts'ien: Les Mémoires Historiques - Bibliothèque Chine ancienne and La bibliothèque numérique Les Classiques des sciences sociales - Collection «Les auteur(e)s classiques» - La Chine ancienne - Les auteurs chinois. 
 Chavannes, Édouard, Maxime Kaltenmark Jacques Pimpaneau, translators. (2015) Les Mémoires historiques de Se-Ma Ts'ien [The Historical Memoirs of Sima Qian], 9 vols.; Éditions You Feng, Paris. This is the completed full translation of the Shiji
 full translation in 9 vols: Vyatkin, Rudolf V., trans. . Istoricheskie Zapiski (Shi-czi) , 8 vols. Moscow: Nauka (1972–2002); 9th volume: Vyatkin, Anatoly R., trans. (2010), Moscow: Vostochnaya literatura. This is the first complete translation into any European language. Full text available online: Сыма Цянь. Исторические записки (Ши цзи).
 Yang, Zhongxian ; Hao, Zhida , eds. (1997). Quanjiao quanzhu quanyi quanping Shiji  [Shiji: Fully Collated, Annotated, Translated, and Evaluated], 6 vols. Tianjin: Tianjin guji chubanshe.
(in Mandarin Chinese) Yang, Yanqi 杨燕起; eds. (2001). “Shi Ji Quan Yi"  史记全译, 12 vols. Guiyang: Guizhou renmin chubanshe 贵州人民出版社 .
(in Mandarin Chinese) Xu, Jialu 许嘉璐; An, Pingqiu 安平秋, eds. (2003). Ershisishi quanyi: Shiji 二十四史全译：史记, 2 vols. Beijing: Hanyudacidian chubanshe. 
 Mizusawa, Toshitada ; Yoshida, Kenkō , trans. (1996–1998). Shiki  [Shiji], 12 vols. Tokyo: Kyūko.
 Mieczysław J. Künstler, trans. (2000). Sy-ma Ts'ien, Syn smoka. Fragmenty Zapisków historyka, Warszawa: Czytelnik; . Selected chapters only.
 Svane, Gunnar O., trans. (2007). Historiske Optegnelser: Kapitlerne 61-130, Biografier 1-70. Aarhus: Aarhus Universitetsforlag.
 Gregor Kneussel, Alexander Saechtig, trans. (2016). Aus den Aufzeichnungen des Chronisten, 3 vols. Beijing: Verlag für fremdsprachige Literatur (Foreign Languages Press); .

See also
Twenty-Four Histories

Notes

References

Citations

Sources 
 Works cited

Further reading 
 Yap, Joseph P, (2019). The Western Regions, Xiongnu and Han, from the Shiji, Hanshu and Hou Hanshu. .

External links 

 
The Original Text in its Entirety (Chinese)
CHINAKNOWLEDGE Shiji  Records of the Grand Scribe.
Ssuma Ch'ien at Internet Sacred Text Archive. Chapters 1–3, Ssuma Ch'ien's Historical Records, translated by Herbert J. Allen:
 "Introductory Chapter" (1894), Journal of the Royal Asiatic Society 26 (2): 269–295. . (text)
 "The Hsia Dynasty" (1895), Journal of the Royal Asiatic Society 27 (1): 93–110. . (text)
 "The Yin Dynasty" (1895), Journal of the Royal Asiatic Society 27 (3): 601–615. . (text)
 Part of chapter 63 The Sacred Books and Early Literature of the East, Volume XII: Medieval China, ed. Charles F. Horne, 1917, pp. 396–398.

2nd-century BC history books
1st-century BC history books
Books about civilizations
Chinese chronicles
Han dynasty literature
Han dynasty texts
Historiography of China
Twenty-Four Histories